Lomatium nudicaule is a species of flowering plant in the carrot family known by the common names pestle lomatium, barestem biscuitroot, Indian celery and Indian consumption plant. It is native to western North America from British Columbia to California to Utah, where it is known from several habitat types, including forest and woodland. It generally lacks a stem, the inflorescence and leaves emerging from ground level. The leaves are made up of many dull green, waxy lance-shaped leaflets each up to 9 cm long. The inflorescence is borne on a stout, leafless peduncle widening at the top where it blooms in an umbel of yellow or purplish flowers.

Uses
This plant is a traditional source of food for many Native American groups, and its parts are used medicinally, including as a treatment for tuberculosis. It also has been used ceremonially in association with the fishing and processing of salmon among peoples of southwestern British Columbia and Washington. For example, the W̱SÁNEĆ (Saanich), who called it qexmín, burn the seeds in a fire or on a stove when drying the salmon. Among other peoples also, including the Kwakwaka'wakw and Nuu-chah-nulth, the seeds are burned as an incense at funerals and chewed by singers to ease their throats.

References

External links
 Calflora Database: Lomatium nudicaule (Barestem biscuitroot, Pestle lomatium, Pestle parsnip)
Jepson Manual eFlora treatment of Lomatium nudicaule
USDA Plants Profile for Lomatium nudicaule (barestem biscuitroot)
UC CalPhotos gallery

nudicaule
Flora of the Northwestern United States
Flora of British Columbia
Flora of California
Flora of Nevada
Flora of Utah
Flora of the Great Basin
Natural history of the California chaparral and woodlands
Taxa named by Frederick Traugott Pursh
Taxa named by John Merle Coulter
Flora without expected TNC conservation status